Cui Yuying (born May 1958) is a Chinese politician of Tibetan ethnicity, serving from January 2015 to January 2018 as the deputy head of the Propaganda Department of the Chinese Communist Party and the deputy director of the State Council Information Office (vice-minister level). She was the first ethnic minority deputy head in the propaganda department's history. Since 29 January 2018, she has served as chairwoman of the Zhejiang Provincial Committee of the Chinese People's Political Consultative Conference.

Career
Cui was born in Changle County, Shandong, but moved to Nyingchi, Tibet, in her youth. She taught elementary school there before enrolling in the department of forestry at the Agriculture and Herders College of Tibet, where she graduated from in 1982. She then went on to complete a study term at the Beijing Forestry University, then returned to Tibet to work in the regional government's planning department, then the audit and economic planning department.

Starting in 1987, Cui began serving at the Tibet division of China Life, where she worked in finance, operations, and motor vehicle insurance. By 1996, she was promoted to vice president of the Tibet division of China Life. In 1999, she was promoted to regional president. As an aspiring and relatively young professional, Cui went on to study at the Central Party School in Beijing and earned a political economics graduate degree there. By July 2002, Cui was named Vice Chairman of the Tibet Autonomous Region, entering the sub-provincial ranks for the first time at 44 years of age. In October 2006, she was elevated again to the regional Party Standing Committee to serve as Tibet regional propaganda chief, entering the inner sanctum of political decision making in Tibet. Her profile was unique because she was a woman of Tibetan heritage; females and ethnic minorities are rarely selected to enter provincial-level standing committees.

In December 2011, she was transferred to Beijing to work for the State Council Information Office as deputy director (vice minister rank), and in January 2015, she was named deputy head of the Central Propaganda Department. Cui was the first ethnic-minority deputy propaganda head in the department's history, dating back to the 1920s.

References

1958 births
Living people
Politicians from Weifang
Political office-holders in Tibet
21st-century Chinese women politicians
21st-century Chinese politicians
Tibetan women in politics
People's Republic of China politicians from Shandong
Chinese Communist Party politicians from Shandong
Members of the 13th Chinese People's Political Consultative Conference